Harvey John Pritchard (30 January 1918 – May 2000) was an English professional footballer who played in the Football League for Southend United, Crystal Palace, Manchester City and Coventry City as an outside forward. He was capped by England at youth level and later served as trainer at Folkestone Town and Chelmsford City.

Career statistics

References 

English Football League players
Clapton Orient F.C. wartime guest players
English footballers
Association football wing halves
England youth international footballers
1918 births
2000 deaths
Association football outside forwards
People from Solihull
Coventry City F.C. players
Crystal Palace F.C. players
Manchester City F.C. players
Southend United F.C. players
Folkestone F.C. players
Leicester City F.C. wartime guest players
Northampton Town F.C. wartime guest players
West Ham United F.C. players